Alcoa Theatre is a half-hour American anthology series telecast on NBC at 9:30 pm on Monday nights from September 30, 1957 to May 23, 1960. The program also aired under the title Turn of Fate. Alcoa Theatre was syndicated together with Goodyear Theatre as Award Theatre.

In 1955, The Alcoa Hour premiered in a one-hour format aired on Sunday nights, but it was reduced to 30 minutes, retitled Alcoa Theatre, and moved to Monday evening in 1957. The show employed an alternating rotating company of actors: David Niven, Robert Ryan, Jane Powell, Jack Lemmon and Charles Boyer. Each appeared in dramatic and light comedic roles through the first season.

Overview

The series continued to feature the talents of veteran and emerging actors over the ensuing years, including Cliff Robertson, John Cassavetes, Brandon deWilde, Cornel Wilde, Agnes Moorehead, Jack Carson, Walter Slezak and Gary Merrill. Child actor Flip Mark made his television debut as Robbie Adams in the 1959 episode "Another Day Another Dollar".

Another child actor, Dennis Holmes, prior to joining the cast of Laramie appeared as Davey Morris in the 1959 episode, "The Night of the Kill."

Gian-Carlo Menotti's Amahl and the Night Visitors remains one of the Alcoa Theatre'''s best-known presentations.

"333 Montgomery" (June 13, 1960) starred DeForest Kelley in the pilot episode of an unsold series written by Gene Roddenberry. It was based on the book Never Plead Guilty by San Francisco criminal lawyer Jake Ehrlich. Kelley acted in three separate pilots for Columbia, and the studio decided to try him in a lead and sent him to meet Roddenberry. Kelley and Roddenberry went to San Francisco to meet Ehrlich, who chose him for the lead. This event was crucial to Kelley's career because it introduced him to Roddenberry, later resulting in his Star Trek'' role.

Jack Lemmon, William Talman and Joan Blackman starred in "The Victim," a suspense episode involving a disappearing woman.

Awards and nominations

Episodes

Series Overview

Season 1 (1957-58)

Season 2 (1958-59)

Season 3 (1959-60)

References

External links
  
Alcoa-Goodyear Theatre at CVTA

1957 American television series debuts
1960 American television series endings
1950s American anthology television series
1960s American anthology television series
1950s American drama television series
1960s American drama television series
Black-and-white American television shows
English-language television shows
NBC original programming
Alcoa
Primetime Emmy Award for Outstanding Drama Series winners